Stanton Jerrold Peale (January 23, 1937 – May 14, 2015) was an American astrophysicist, planetary scientist, and Professor at the University of California, Santa Barbara. His research interests include the geophysical and dynamical properties of planets and exoplanets.

Career
Stanton J. Peale received a Ph.D. in astronomy from Cornell University in 1965, where he worked with Thomas Gold. He was an assistant professor of astronomy at UCLA before moving to UCSB in 1968.

Scientific contributions
In 1969 Peale published a generalization of Cassini's laws that explain the rotation of the Moon and other bodies subject to tides.

In 1976 Peale published a procedure to determine the size and state of the core of Mercury.

In 1979 Peale and collaborators predicted that Jupiter's satellite Io might show widespread volcanism as a result of the action of tides. This prediction was confirmed by data from the Voyager 1 Mission which showed that Io is the most volcanically active body in the solar system.

He died on May 14, 2015 in Santa Barbara, California.

Honors
Newcomb Cleveland Prize (1979)
James Craig Watson Medal Award for Contributions to Astronomy (1982)
Brouwer Award (1992)
National Academy of Sciences (2009)
Kuiper Prize (2016)

References

External links
 Stan Peale's web page at UCSB

Members of the United States National Academy of Sciences
American astrophysicists
Cornell University alumni
Planetary scientists
University of California, Santa Barbara faculty
1937 births
2015 deaths